Argonaute is a ship of the French Navy specialised in rescue and decontamination.

Argonaute is equipped for the NATO Submarine Rescue System.

Sources and references 

 Bâtiment de soutien, d'assistance et de dépollution Argonaute, netmarine.net

2003 ships
Auxiliary ships of the French Navy